Corotoman was a 17th and 18th century plantation on the Rappahannock River in Lancaster County, Virginia, United States. Corotoman was the residence of Robert Carter I (1662/63 – 4 August 1732), a colonial Governor of Virginia and one of the wealthiest men in the British colonies in North America. Corotoman was located on a point overlooking the Rappahannock River, and flanked by Carter's Creek and Corrotoman River to its east and west respectively.

History

Earliest inhabitants
Corotoman was first inhabited by the Cuttatwomen Native American tribe several hundred years before the arrival of English colonists to Lancaster County, Virginia.

John Carter I
John Carter I, the patriarch of the Carter family of Virginia, purchased and settled Corotoman between 1652 and 1653. Carter developed and improved the lands into a plantation and constructed the first structures on the property before his death in 1669. Carter's mansion, known as the "Old House", was built in the traditional 17th century hall-parlor plan with a porch chamber.

Robert Carter I

Corotoman was then inherited by Carter's son Robert Carter I (whose wealth and autocratic business methods led to his becoming known by the nickname "King") in 1690. Under Robert Carter I's ownership, Corotoman became the center of what developed into a  estate of 48 plantations and farms including places such as Indian Town and Hills Quarters.

Construction
Robert Carter began construction of the large Georgian mansion at Corotoman around 1720. The mansion was completed in 1725, and introduced a new era for early 18th-century architecture in Virginia. Corotoman also set the pattern for 18th-century architectural patronage. The mansion at Corotoman rivaled the other important Colonial mansions of Virginia, and affirmed Robert Carter I's status as the most powerful planter in the aristocracy of the Tidewater region. Carter's correspondences and diary revealed that the construction of the mansion at Corotoman was a lengthy, complex, and frustrating endeavor. Construction materials for the mansion included paving stones from England, lumber from his plantation saw mills and from neighboring plantations, and oyster shells for mortar. For some of the mansion's windows, Carter used iron casement frames for quarrel glass. To undertake the mansion's construction, Carter imported skilled indentured servants from England and hired local craftsmen.

Gardens
Carter employed an English gardener, whom he instructed "to bring the yards around the mansion into closer accord with the architectural rhythms of the mansion. Little is currently known of the garden's contents and design.

Brick House Store
At Corotoman, Carter maintained a building known as the "Brick House Store" where he kept imported goods that he sold and bartered to local planter. In 1730, an inventory of items at the Brick House Store included essential supplies such as cloths, tools, and gunpowder and luxury items such as spices, ivory combs, and brass candlesticks.

Spinster's House

Another supporting structure at Corotoman was known as the "Spinster's House." The house was constructed in either the late 17th century or the early 18th century. The "Spinster's House" was a one-story and a half frame house adorned with a gabled roof with large end chimneys. It lay in ruins for years before finally disappearing around 1930. Before its disappearance, the "Spinster's House" was the last remaining supporting structure of the original Corotoman plantation.

Destruction
In 1729, four years after "King" Carter's mansion was completed, a fire destroyed it. Carter made little mention of the mansion fire in his diary, but did lament the total destruction of his wine cellar. Carter died three years later and the mansion was not rebuilt. An inventory taken in 1732 after Carter's death implies that after the fire, Carter resided in either the "Old House" or the "Spinster's House" at Corotoman rather than rebuild it because of fiscal difficulties or ill health. In the mid-19th century, Corotoman and its adjacent lands passed out of the Carter family when they were sold by a granddaughter of Charles Carter.

Successive ownership
A mansion was rebuilt at Corotoman by successive owners, but was destroyed by fire around 1900.

In Spring 2000, the Association for the Preservation of Virginia Antiquities acquired the site of Corotoman.

Architecture
Robert Carter I's 1725 Georgian mansion was a two-story brick dwelling with a two-story porch, which Carter referred to as a piazza. Its central entrance hall was paved in black and white marble brought to Virginia from England. The entrance hall was flanked by Carter's bedchamber and a lavishly decorated parlor, both with large closets. Along the mansion's façade against the Rappahannock River ran a gallery. Below the gallery was an arcade and three pavilions.

While the mansion was destroyed by fire four years after its completion, the "Spinster's House" on the Corotoman estate survived until around 1930.

Archaeology
In 1978, archaeologists led by Dr. Carter Hudgins and the Virginia Department of Historic Resources excavated the foundations of Robert Carter I's Georgian mansion at Corotoman. Considerable rubble was unearthed at Corotoman, including white marble pavers, fragments of dressed stone and rubbed brick, Delft tile, Chinese porcelain, tankards, and over 1,000 wine bottles. Artifacts unearthed at Corotoman are currently displayed at the Christ Church museum.

See also
Christ Church (Lancaster County, Virginia)
Weems, Virginia

References

External links
Corotoman, Rappahannock River, Weems, Lancaster County, VA: 1 photo, 1 measured drawing, and 6 data pages at Historic American Buildings Survey

Historic American Buildings Survey in Virginia
Carter family residences
Houses in Lancaster County, Virginia
Houses completed in 1725
Houses on the National Register of Historic Places in Virginia
Georgian architecture in Virginia
Plantation houses in Virginia
Archaeological sites in Virginia
Archaeological sites on the National Register of Historic Places in Virginia
Colonial architecture in Virginia
National Register of Historic Places in Lancaster County, Virginia
1652 establishments in Virginia
Burned houses in the United States